|}
{| class="collapsible collapsed" cellpadding="0" cellspacing="0" style="clear:right; float:right; text-align:center; font-weight:bold;" width="280px"
! colspan="3" style="border:1px solid black; background-color: #77DD77;" | Also Ran

The 2004 Epsom Derby was a horse race that took place at Epsom Downs on Saturday 5 June 2004. It was the 225th running of the Derby, won by the pre-race joint favourite North Light. The winner was ridden by Kieren Fallon and trained by Sir Michael Stoute. The other joint favourite Snow Ridge finished seventh.

Race details
Sponsor: Vodafone
Winner's prize money: £788,220
Going: Good
Number of runners: 14
Winner's time: 2m 33.72s

Full result

* The distances between the horses are shown in lengths or shorter. hd = head; nk = neck.† Trainers are based in Great Britain unless indicated.

Winner's details
Further details of the winner, North Light:
Foaled: 1 March 2001 in Ireland
Sire: Danehill; Dam: Sought Out (Rainbow Quest)
Owner: Ballymacoll Stud
Breeder: Ballymacoll Stud Farm Ltd
Rating in 2004 World Thoroughbred Racehorse Rankings: 122

Form analysis

Two-year-old races
Notable runs by the future Derby participants as two-year-olds in 2003.

Rule of Law – 1st Acomb Stakes, 3rd Royal Lodge Stakes
Let the Lion Roar – 2nd Haynes, Hanson and Clark Stakes
American Post – 1st Prix Jean-Luc Lagardère, 1st Racing Post Trophy
Snow Ridge – 1st Royal Lodge Stakes, 9th Dewhurst Stakes
Elshadi – 1st Haynes, Hanson and Clark Stakes, 4th Autumn Stakes

The road to Epsom
Early-season appearances in 2004 and trial races prior to running in the Derby.

North Light – 1st Dante Stakes
Rule of Law – 2nd Dante Stakes
Let the Lion Roar – 3rd Dante Stakes
Percussionist – 1st Lingfield Derby Trial
Salford City – 1st Greenham Stakes, 6th 2,000 Guineas
American Post – 1st Prix Omnium II, 1st Prix de Fontainebleau, 1st Poule d'Essai des Poulains
Snow Ridge – 2nd 2,000 Guineas
Hazyview – 1st Newmarket Stakes, 2nd Lingfield Derby Trial, 1st Fairway Stakes
Gatwick – 1st Haydock Silver Bowl
Meath – 2nd Leopardstown 2,000 Guineas Trial Stakes, 2nd Amethyst Stakes, 1st Gallinule Stakes

Subsequent Group 1 wins
Group 1 / Grade I victories after running in the Derby.

Rule of Law – St. Leger (2004)

Subsequent breeding careers
Leading progeny of participants in the 2004 Epsom Derby.

Sires of Classic winners
North Light (1st)
 Arctic Cosmos - 1st St Leger Stakes (2010)
 Celtic New Year - 2nd Charles Whittingham Memorial Handicap (2011)

Sires of Group/Grade One winners
American Post (6th)
 Robin Of Navan - 1st Critérium de Saint-Cloud (2015)
 Ana Americana - 3rd Prix Saint-Alary (2009)
 Liliside - 1st(disqualified) Poule d'Essai des Pouliches (2010) dam of Lys Gracieux (Japanese Horse of the Year 2019)
 Got Away - 1st Charnwood Forest Mares' Chase (2018)

Other Stallions
Let The Lion Roar (3rd) - Nautical Nitwit (1st West Yorkshire Hurdle 2018)Rule Of Law (2nd) - Exported to Japan before relocating to Ireland - Minor jumps winners

References

sportinglife.com

Epsom Derby
 2004
Epsom Derby
Epsom Derby
2000s in Surrey